Revolutionary Students Federation (FER, Federaçom Estudantil Revolucionária in the reintegrationist spelling of the Galician language) was a Galician independentist and socialist student union, formed by university students. FER was founded in October 1999. Despite its small membership the organization participated in several student strikes and protests.

In 2001 FER promoted the merge of several galician independentist and anticapitalist student unions to form AGIR (student organization).

References

Secessionist organizations in Europe
1999 establishments in Spain
Galician nationalism
Socialism